Sipe Sipe Municipality is the second municipal section of the Quillacollo Province in the Cochabamba Department, Bolivia. Its seat is Sipe Sipe. At the time of census 2001 the municipality had 31,337 inhabitants.

Geography 
Some of the highest mountains of the municipality are listed below:

Subdivision 
Sipe Sipe Municipality is divided into three cantons.

See also 
 Ch'aki Mayu
 Inka Raqay

References 

Municipalities of the Cochabamba Department